Raw Fury AB is a Swedish video game publisher, specialising in the publication of indie games, based in Stockholm. The company was founded in 2015 by Jonas Antonsson and Gordon Van Dyke.

History 
The company was founded in 2015 by Jonas Antonsson, ex-vice-president of mobile for Paradox Interactive, and Gordon Van Dyke, formerly a producer for EA DICE on the various Battlefield titles. The company was announced in April 2015 as a "publisher for boutique and indie games", calling themselves an "UnPublisher" as they intend to support developers by "dismantl[ing] how publishing traditionally works" and providing supportive services that better serve indie game development.

In July 2016, Karl Magnus Troedsson stepped down as general manager of EA DICE to become a partner and co-owner of Raw Fury. In early September 2019, Raw Fury opened an internal development studio located in Zagreb, Croatia, to aid external developers with porting, quality assurance, and other support matters. At the same time, the company moved headquarters within Stockholm to cope with its growing employee count, which reached roughly 40 people worldwide.

In August 2021, Altor Equity Partners acquired a majority ownership of Raw Fury for an undisclosed price. Raw Fury said, "The experience and monetary boost that Altor brings to the table will allow us to increase our production capacity and add to the team at Raw Fury, giving us the ability to publish larger projects while continuing to still fund smaller projects and experimental art."

In October 2021, Raw Fury announced that they had entered into a first-look deal with DJ2 Entertainment to develop the television and film projects.

Games published

References

External links 
 

Video game companies established in 2015
Swedish companies established in 2015
Companies based in Stockholm
Video game companies of Sweden
Video game publishers
Indie video games
Privately held companies of Sweden
2021 mergers and acquisitions